is a Japanese women's professional shogi player ranked 2-dan.

Promotion history
Kitamura's promotion history is as follows:

 3-kyū: April 1, 2013
 2-kyū: June 24, 2013
 1-kyū: April 1, 2014
 1-dan: June 26, 2015
 2-dan: January 18, 2023

Note: All ranks are women's professional ranks.

Personal life
Kitamura is a graduate of Ritsumeikan University. Kitamura married professional shogi player Wakamu Deguchi in April 2021. She stated that she will continue to be active professionally under her maiden name.

References

External links
 ShogiHub: Kitamura, Keika

Japanese shogi players
Living people
Women's professional shogi players
Professional shogi players from Kyoto Prefecture
1995 births
People from Kyoto Prefecture
Ritsumeikan University alumni